Maciej Pilitowski (born 27 October 1990) is a Polish handball player for Energa MKS Kalisz and the Polish national team.

Career

National team
Pilitowski made his debut for the national team on 4 January 2013, in a friendly match against Hungary (27:29). He was also chosen to participate at the 2014 European Championship in Denmark, but failed to make it to the final squad.

He represented Poland at the 2020 European Men's Handball Championship.

References

1990 births
Living people
People from Ciechanów
Polish male handball players